Joseph Mellen (born September 1939) is the British-born author of Bore Hole, a book about his attempts at self-trepanation, influenced by Bart Huges, and his eventual success with the help of his partner Amanda Feilding.

Mellen and Feilding lived together from the late 1960s until the early 1990s. They had two sons, Rock Basil Hugo Feilding-Mellen (born 1979) and Cosmo Birdie Feilding-Mellen (born 1985).  Rock Feilding-Mellen was a local councillor and cabinet member for housing, property and regeneration with the Royal Borough of Kensington and Chelsea. Following the Grenfell Tower fire and its aftermath, he resigned.

In 1994 Mellen met Jenny Gathorne-Hardy, who was trepanned in 1995. Their son Rudy Blu was born in 1996 and they were married later that year; their daughter Lily was born in 2012.

References

Other sources
Michell John (1984), Eccentric Lives and Peculiar Notions,

External links
 "The People With Holes In Their Heads" - from Eccentric Lives and Peculiar Notions by John Michell
 Joe Mellen - website with e-books
interview with Joe Mellen at vice.com

Living people
1939 births